Nélida Béjar (born 1979 in Munich) is a Spanish composer based in Germany. She studied Music at the Hochschule für Musik und Theater München and Composition  with Wilfried Hiller at Richard Strauss Conservatory in Munich. In 2012 she received a PhD in Composition  at Trinity College, Dublin, where she studied with Donnacha Dennehy.

In 2009, she founded the undercoverfiction ensemble for contemporary music and music theater in Munich, along with theater director Björn Potulski. In this team, she has created opera productions in the spirit of community theatre, working with companies that are linked to the theme of the respective project: "Schwerer als Luft" (2010) in cooperation with Munich Airport, where the singers on stage were aircraft handlers; "This New Ocean" (2013) in cooperation with various airlines, where the singers are crew members of the airlines.
Béjar teaches Music and Media at the Hochschule für Musik und Theater München.

Selected works 
Orchestra
 Kilter for large orchestra (2007)

Ensemble

 Nachtschattenklänge for two pianos and percussion (2002)
 Cortaziana für baritone und 14 instruments (2005)
 In der Sonne trage schwarz for wind octett and double bass (2008)

Stage music
 Creation, for piano and electronics (2007)
 Exodus, for live processed violin (2008)

Music theatre and opera
Toward Perpetual Peace, for ensemble and live electronics (2010)
Schwerer als Luft, choreographic opera for mixed ensemble and a choir of aircraft handlers (2012)
This New Ocean, opera for mixed ensemble, soprano, alto, countertenor, tenor, bass and mixed choir (2014)
The City, music theatre for soprano, mixed choir, synthesizer and drum set (2016)

Awards 
 2004 Fellowship of the State of Bavaria at the Cité internationale des arts in Paris
 2005 Richard Strauss Prize of the City of Munich
 2007-2008 Residence at the Internationales Künstlerhaus Villa Concordia in Bamberg
 2011 Music award of the City of Munich

Discography 
 „Punkt 11“ neue und neuere Musik (Werke von Edlund, Béjar, Xenakis, Hosokawa, Rihm, Ishii, Gourzi, Trüstedt/Schäffer), Hochschule für Musik und Theater München / Bayerischer Rundfunk, 2003
 Singphonic Christmas, Die Singphoniker (2005)
 9 Fanfaren, brass ensemble of RSK, published for the anniversary of the Deutsches Museum of Munich (2004)

References

External links 
 nelidabejar.com
 undercoverfiction ensemble
 Internationales Künstlerhaus Villa Concordia

1979 births
Living people
Spanish women classical composers
Spanish expatriates in Germany
Spanish expatriates in Ireland
21st-century classical composers
Spanish opera composers
German opera composers
University of Music and Performing Arts Munich alumni
Alumni of Trinity College Dublin
Women classical composers
Women opera composers
21st-century German composers
21st-century women composers